A pine is any conifer tree or shrub in the genus Pinus of the family Pinaceae. Pinus is the sole genus in the subfamily Pinoideae. The World Flora Online created by the Royal Botanic Gardens, Kew and Missouri Botanical Garden accepts 187 species names of pines as current, together with more synonyms. The American Conifer Society (ACS) and the Royal Horticultural Society accept 121 species. Pines are commonly found in the Northern Hemisphere. Pine may also refer to the lumber derived from pine trees; it is one of the more extensively used types of lumber. The pine family is the largest conifer family and there are currently 818 named cultivars (or trinomials) recognized by the ACS.

Description

Pines are long lived and typically reach ages of 100–1,000 years, some even more. The longest-lived is the Great Basin bristlecone pine (P. longaeva). One individual of this species, dubbed "Methuselah", is one of the world's oldest living organisms at around 4,800 years old. This tree can be found in the White Mountains of California. An older tree, now cut down, was dated at 4,900 years old. It was discovered in a grove beneath Wheeler Peak and it is now known as "Prometheus" after the Greek immortal.

The spiral growth of branches, needles, and cones scales may be arranged in Fibonacci number ratios. The new spring shoots are sometimes called "candles"; they are covered in brown or whitish bud scales and point upward at first, then later turn green and spread outward. These "candles" offer foresters a means to evaluate fertility of the soil and vigour of the trees.

Bark 

The bark of most pines is thick and scaly, but some species have thin, flaky bark. The branches are produced in regular "pseudo whorls", actually a very tight spiral but appearing like a ring of branches arising from the same point. Many pines are uninodal, producing just one such whorl of branches each year, from buds at the tip of the year's new shoot, but others are multinodal, producing two or more whorls of branches per year.

Foliage 
Pines have four types of leaf:
 Seed leaves (cotyledons) on seedlings are borne in a whorl of 4–24.
These are produced for six months to five years, rarely longer.
 Scale leaves, similar to bud scales, are small, brown and not photosynthetic, and arranged spirally like the juvenile leaves.
 Needles, the adult leaves, are green (photosynthetic) and bundled in clusters called fascicles. The needles can number from one to seven per fascicle, but generally number from two to five. Each fascicle is produced from a small bud on a dwarf shoot in the axil of a scale leaf. These bud scales often remain on the fascicle as a basal sheath. The needles persist for 1.5–40 years, depending on species. If a shoot's growing tip is damaged (e.g. eaten by an animal), the needle fascicles just below the damage will generate a stem-producing bud, which can then replace the lost growth tip.

Cones

Pines are monoecious, having the male and female cones on the same tree. The male cones are small, typically 1–5 cm long, and only present for a short period (usually in spring, though autumn in a few pines), falling as soon as they have shed their pollen. The female cones take 1.5–3 years (depending on species) to mature after pollination, with actual fertilization delayed one year. At maturity the female cones are 3–60 cm long. Each cone has numerous spirally arranged scales, with two seeds on each fertile scale; the scales at the base and tip of the cone are small and sterile, without seeds.

The seeds are mostly small and winged, and are anemophilous (wind-dispersed), but some are larger and have only a vestigial wing, and are bird-dispersed. Female cones are woody and sometimes armed to protect developing seeds from foragers. At maturity, the cones usually open to release the seeds. In some of the bird-dispersed species, for example whitebark pine, the seeds are only released by the bird breaking the cones open. In others, the seeds are stored in closed cones for many years until an environmental cue triggers the cones to open, releasing the seeds. This is called serotiny. The most common form of serotiny is pyriscence, in which a resin binds the cones shut until melted by a forest fire, for example in P. rigida.

Taxonomy

Pines are gymnosperms. The genus is divided into two subgenera based on the number of fibrovascular bundles in the needle. The subgenera can be distinguished by cone, seed, and leaf characters:
Pinus subg. Pinus, the yellow, or hard pine group, generally with harder wood and two or three needles per fascicle. The subgenus is also named diploxylon, on account of its two fibrovascular bundles.
Pinus subg. Strobus, the white, or soft pine group. Its members usually have softer wood and five needles per fascicle. The subgenus is also named haploxylon, on account of its one fibrovascular bundle.

Phylogenetic evidence indicates that both subgenera have a very ancient divergence from one another. Each subgenus is further divided into sections and subsections.

Many of the smaller groups of Pinus are composed of closely related species with recent divergence and history of hybridization. This results in low morphological and genetic differences. This, coupled with low sampling and underdeveloped genetic techniques, has made taxonomy difficult to determine. Recent research using large genetic datasets has clarified these relationships into the groupings we recognize today.

Etymology 
The modern English name "pine" derives from Latin pinus,  which some have traced to the Indo-European base *pīt- ‘resin’ (source of English pituitary). Before the 19th century, pines were often referred to as firs (from Old Norse fura, by way of Middle English firre). In some European languages, Germanic cognates of the Old Norse name are still in use for pines — in Danish fyr, in Norwegian fura/fure/furu, Swedish fura/furu, Dutch vuren, and German Föhre — but in modern English, fir is now restricted to fir (Abies) and Douglas-fir (Pseudotsuga).

Phylogeny 
Pinus is the largest genus of the Pinaceae, the pine family, which first appeared in the Jurassic period. Based on recent Transcriptome analysis, Pinus is most closely related to the genus Cathaya, which in turn is closely related to spruces. These genera, with firs and larches, form the pinoid clade of the Pinaceae. Pines first appeared during the Early Cretaceous, with the oldest verified fossil of the genus is Pinus yorkshirensis from the Hauterivian-Barremian boundary (131–129 million years ago) from the Speeton Clay, England.

The evolutionary history of the genus Pinus has been complicated by hybridization. Pines are prone to inter-specific breeding. Wind pollination, long life spans, overlapping generations, large population size, and weak reproductive isolation make breeding across species more likely. As the pines have diversified, gene transfer between different species has created a complex history of genetic relatedness.

The following cladogram shows the phylogenetic relationships between the pine species as described in 2021.

Distribution and habitat

Pines are native to the Northern Hemisphere, and to a few parts from the tropics to temperate regions in the Southern Hemisphere. Most regions of the Northern Hemisphere host some native species of pines. One species (Sumatran pine) crosses the equator in Sumatra to 2°S. In North America, various species occur in regions at latitudes from as far north as 66°N to as far south as 12°N.

They often occur in mountainous areas with favorable soils and at least some water.

Various species have been introduced to temperate and subtropical regions of both hemispheres, where they are grown as timber or cultivated as ornamental plants in parks and gardens. A number of such introduced species have become naturalized, and some species are considered invasive in some areas and threaten native ecosystems.

Ecology 

Pines grow well in acid soils, some also on calcareous soils; most require good soil drainage, preferring sandy soils, but a few (e.g. lodgepole pine) can tolerate poorly drained wet soils. A few are able to sprout after forest fires (e.g. Canary Island pine). Some species of pines (e.g. bishop pine) need fire to regenerate, and their populations slowly decline under fire suppression regimens.

Pine trees are beneficial to the environment since they can remove carbon dioxide from the atmosphere. Although several studies have indicated that after the establishment of pine plantations in grasslands, there is an alteration of carbon pools including a decrease of the soil organic carbon pool.

Several species are adapted to extreme conditions imposed by elevation and latitude (e.g. Siberian dwarf pine, mountain pine, whitebark pine, and the bristlecone pines). The pinyon pines and a number of others, notably Turkish pine and gray pine, are particularly well adapted to growth in hot, dry semidesert climates.

Pine pollen may play an important role in the functioning of detrital food webs. Nutrients from pollen aid detritivores in development, growth, and maturation, and may enable fungi to decompose nutritionally scarce litter. Pine pollen is also involved in moving plant matter between terrestrial and aquatic ecosystems.

Wildlife 

Pine needles serve as food for various Lepidoptera (butterfly and moth) species. Several species of pine are attacked by nematodes, causing pine wilt disease, which can kill some quickly. Some of these Lepidoptera species, many of them moths, specialize in feeding on only one or sometimes several species of pine. Beside that many species of birds and mammals shelter in pine habitat or feed on pine nuts.

The seeds are commonly eaten by birds, such as grouse, crossbills, jays, nuthatches, siskins, and woodpeckers, and by squirrels. Some birds, notably the spotted nutcracker, Clark's nutcracker, and pinyon jay, are of importance in distributing pine seeds to new areas. Pine needles are sometimes eaten by the Symphytan species pine sawfly, and goats.

Uses

Lumber and construction 
Pines are among the most commercially important tree species valued for their timber and wood pulp throughout the world. In temperate and tropical regions, they are fast-growing softwoods that grow in relatively dense stands, their acidic decaying needles inhibiting the sprouting of competing hardwoods.  Commercial pines are grown in plantations for timber that is denser and therefore more durable than spruce (Picea).  Pine wood is widely used in high-value carpentry items such as furniture, window frames, panelling, floors, and roofing, and the resin of some species is an important source of turpentine.

Because pine wood has no insect- or decay-resistant qualities after logging, in its untreated state it is generally recommended for indoor construction purposes only (indoor drywall framing, for example). For outside use, pine needs to be treated with copper azole, chromated copper arsenate or other suitable chemical preservative.

Ornamental uses 

Many pine species make attractive ornamental plantings for parks and larger gardens with a variety of dwarf cultivars being suitable for smaller spaces. Pines are also commercially grown and harvested for Christmas trees.  Pine cones, the largest and most durable of all conifer cones, are craft favorites.  Pine boughs, appreciated especially in wintertime for their pleasant smell and greenery, are popularly cut for decorations. Pine needles are also used for making decorative articles such as baskets, trays, pots, etc., and during the U.S. Civil War, the needles of the longleaf pine "Georgia pine" were widely employed in this. This originally Native American skill is now being replicated across the world. Pine needle handicrafts are made in the US, Canada, Mexico, Nicaragua, and India. Pine needles are also versatile and have been used by Latvian designer Tamara Orjola to create different biodegradable products including paper, furniture, textiles and dye.

Farming
When grown for sawing timber, pine plantations can be harvested after 25 years, with some stands being allowed to grow up to 50 (as the wood value increases more quickly as the trees age). Imperfect trees (such as those with bent trunks or forks, smaller trees, or diseased trees) are removed in a "thinning" operation every 5–10 years. Thinning allows the best trees to grow much faster, because it prevents weaker trees from competing for sunlight, water, and nutrients. Young trees removed during thinning are used for pulpwood or are left in the forest, while most older ones are good enough for saw timber.

This however depends on the region, species and silvicultural techniques. Trees are normally planted 3–4 m apart, or about 1,000 per hectare (100,000 per square kilometre).

Food and nutrients
The seeds (pine nuts) are generally edible; the young male cones can be cooked and eaten, as can the bark of young twigs. Some species have large pine nuts, which are harvested and sold for cooking and baking. They are an essential ingredient of pesto alla genovese.

The soft, moist, white inner bark (cambium) beneath the woody outer bark is edible and very high in vitamins A and C. It can be eaten raw in slices as a snack or dried and ground up into a powder for use as an ersatz flour or thickener in stews, soups, and other foods, such as bark bread. Adirondack Indians got their name from the Mohawk Indian word atirú:taks, meaning "tree eaters".

A tea is made by steeping young, green pine needles in boiling water (known as tallstrunt in Sweden). In eastern Asia, pine and other conifers are accepted among consumers as a beverage product, and used in teas, as well as wine. In Greece, the wine retsina is flavoured with Aleppo pine resin.

Pine needles from Pinus densiflora were found to contain 30.54 milligram/gram of proanthocyanidins when extracted with hot water. Comparative to ethanol extraction resulting in 30.11 mg/g, simply extracting in hot water is preferable.

In traditional Chinese medicine, pine resin is used for burns, wounds and dermal complaints.

Culture 

Pines have been a frequently mentioned tree throughout history, including in literature, paintings and other art, and in religious texts.

Literature 
Writers of various nationalities and ethnicities have written of pines. Among them, John Muir, Dora Sigerson Shorter, Eugene Field, Bai Juyi, Theodore Winthrop, and Rev. George Allan D.D.

Art 

Pines are often featured in art, whether painting and fine art, drawing, photography, or folk art.

Religious texts 
Pine trees, as well as other conifers, are mentioned in some verses of the Bible, depending on the translation. In the Book of Nehemiah 8:15, the King James Version gives the following translation:"And that they should publish and proclaim in all their cities, and in Jerusalem, saying, Go forth unto the mount, and fetch olive branches, and pine branches [emphasis added], and myrtle branches, and palm branches, and branches of thick trees, to make booths, as it is written."
However, the term here in Hebrew (עץ שמן) means "oil tree" and it is not clear what kind of tree is meant. Pines are also mentioned in some translations of Isaiah 60:13, such as the King James:"The glory of Lebanon shall come unto thee, the fir tree, the pine tree, and the box together, to beautify the place of my sanctuary; and I will make the place of my feet glorious."
Again, it is not clear what tree is meant (תדהר in Hebrew), and other translations use "pine" for the word translated as "box" by the King James (תאשור in Hebrew).

Some botanical authorities believe that the Hebrew word "ברוש" (bərōsh), which is used many times in the Bible, designates P. halepensis, or in Hosea 14:8 which refers to fruit, Pinus pinea, the stone pine.

The word used in modern Hebrew for pine is "אֹ֖רֶן" (oren), which occurs only in Isaiah 44:14, but two manuscripts have "ארז" (cedar), a much more common word.

Chinese culture
The pine is a motif in Chinese art and literature, which sometimes combines painting and poetry in the same work. Some of the main symbolic attributes of pines in Chinese art and literature are longevity and steadfastness: the pine retains its green needles through all the seasons. Sometimes the pine and cypress are paired. At other times the pine, plum, and bamboo are considered as the "Three Friends of Winter". Many Chinese art works and/or literature (some involving pines) have been done using paper, brush, and Chinese ink: interestingly enough, one of the main ingredients for Chinese ink has been pine soot.

See also 
 El Pino (The Pine Tree)
 Pine barrens
 Pine-cypress forest
 Pine Tree Flag
 Tree of Peace

References

Bibliography

External links 

40 Species of Pine Trees You Can Grow by The Spruce
, covers Californian species
Pinus in Flora of North America
Pinus in the USDA Plants Database
Conifer Database

Pinaceae